Route 3 is a series of expressways in Hong Kong that runs from Sai Ying Pun on Hong Kong Island to Yuen Long in the New Territories, linking West Kowloon, Kwai Chung and Tsing Yi. It was built as part of the Airport Core Programme to provide access to Hong Kong International Airport from the city, and to relieve congestion in the New Territories. The Western Harbour Crossing and Tai Lam Tunnel that form part of the route are tollways.

Route description
The route originates at the junction with Route 4 at Connaught Road in Sai Ying Pun, and immediately crosses the Victoria Harbour through the tolled Western Harbour Crossing. From then on it heads northwest on a viaduct along the West Kowloon Highway, above the Tung Chung line and Airport Express tracks. This section has three exits that connects with Route 8, Route 7 and Route 5 respectively. It then enters the Tsing Kwai Highway in Lai Chi Kok and continues west to Tsing Yi Island on Rambler Channel Bridge. Once it reaches the island, the Cheung Tsing Tunnel immediately follows. At the other end of the tunnel, Route 3 enters the Tsing Yi Northwestern Interchange and meet with Route 8 again. The interchange is a gateway to Lantau Island and Chek Lap Kok Airport. Route 3 then makes a sharp turn and travels north on Ting Kau Bridge and quickly enters the tolled Tai Lam Tunnel. From there, the remainder of the route is dubbed the Country Park Section which runs all the way to Kam Tin along the Tsing Long Highway, and joins Route 9 near Pok Oi Hospital.

The route is made up of the following roads: 
 Western Harbour Crossing
 West Kowloon Highway
 Tsing Kwai Highway
 Cheung Tsing Bridge and Cheung Tsing Tunnel (within Tsing Ma Control Area)
 Cheung Tsing Highway (within Tsing Ma Control Area)
 Ting Kau Bridge (within Tsing Ma Control Area)
 Tai Lam Tunnel
 Tsing Long Highway

Exits and interchanges

References

 
Routes in Hong Kong